Waizi town is the northernmost town of Xinye County that lies in the southwest of Henan province, China. Its total area is 102 square kilometers. The G55 Erenhot–Guangzhou Expressway runs through this town and has an exit here.

References

Towns in Nanyang, Henan
Xinye County